This is a list of Xbox 360 games that were released via retail disc, digital download or as part of the Xbox Live Arcade program.

There are  games on both parts of this list.

Cancelled games

See also

 List of best-selling Xbox 360 video games
 List of Xbox 360 System Link games
 List of Xbox games compatible with Xbox 360
 List of Xbox games on Windows Phone

Notes

References

Xbox 360